Brandon Sebirumbi (born May 15, 1990) is a Ugandan-American professional basketball player who formerly played for Aomori Wat's of the B.League in Japan.

Collegiate career 
Sebirumbi played college basketball with the Furman Paladins. He averaged 5.3 points and 2.8 rebounds per game as a sophomore.

Professional career 
On September 6, 2013, Sebirumbi signed with Planasa Navarra of the LEB Oro in Spain.

International career 
On August 5, 2015, Uganda national basketball team head coach Mandy Juruni announced that Sebirumbi would join the team for the AfroBasket 2015. He was named to the final roster with the likes of Henry Malinga.

References

External links 
Furman bio
Eurobasket.com profile

1990 births
Living people
American expatriate basketball people in Australia
American expatriate basketball people in Japan
American expatriate basketball people in Portugal
American expatriate basketball people in Spain
American men's basketball players
American people of Ugandan descent
Aomori Wat's players
Basket Navarra Club players
Basketball players from Texas
Power forwards (basketball)
Furman Paladins men's basketball players
Small forwards
Sportspeople from Fort Worth, Texas
Ugandan men's basketball players